The 1981 Men's World Team Squash Championships were held in Sweden and took place from September 24 until October 3, 1981.

Results

Group 1 (Gävle)

Group 2 (Malmö)

Group 3 (Gothenburg)

Group 4 (Linköping)

Final Pool A (Stockholm)

Final Pool B (Stockholm)

Third Place Play Off (Stockholm)

Final

References

See also 
World Team Squash Championships
World Squash Federation
World Open (squash)

World Squash Championships
Squash tournaments in Sweden
International sports competitions hosted by Sweden
Squash
Men